Chinese pronouns ( or ) differ somewhat from pronouns in English and other Indo-European languages. For instance, there is no differentiation in the spoken language between "he", "she" and "it" (though a written difference was introduced after contact with the West), and pronouns are not inflected to indicate whether they are the subject or object of a sentence. Mandarin Chinese further lacks a distinction between the possessive adjective ("my") and possessive pronoun ("mine"); both are formed by appending the particle  de. Pronouns in Chinese are often substituted by honorific alternatives.

Personal pronouns

In Mandarin 

{| class="wikitable" style="border-width: 0; text-align:center;"
|+ Personal pronouns
|- 
! Person
! colspan="4" | Singular
! colspan="4" | Plural*
|-
! rowspan="2" | First person
| colspan="4" rowspan="2" | wǒI, me
| colspan="2" | Exclusive
| colspan="2" | Inclusive
|-
| colspan="2" | **wǒmenwe, us
| colspan="2" | †zánmenwe
|-
! rowspan="2" | Second person
| colspan="2" | Informal
| colspan="2" | Formal
| colspan="4" rowspan="2" | nǐmenyou
|-
| colspan="2" | nǐyou
| colspan="2" | nínyou
|-
! Third person
| colspan="4" | tāhe/she/it, him/her
| colspan="4" | tāmenthey, them‡
|}

**  can be either inclusive or exclusive, depending on the circumstance where it is used.
†Used to indicate 'you and I' (two people) only, and can only be used as a subject (not an object); in all other cases wǒmen is used. This form has fallen into disuse outside Beijing, and may be a Manchu influence.

Following the iconoclastic May Fourth Movement in 1919, and to accommodate the translation of Western literature, written vernacular Chinese developed separate pronouns for gender-differentiated speech, and to address animals, deities, and inanimate objects.

Throughout the 1920s, a debate continued between three camps: those that preferred to preserve the preexisting use of  without distinction between genders, those that wished to preserve the spoken non-gendered pronoun but introduce a new female pronoun  in writing, and those that wished to introduce a differently pronounced female pronoun . The pronoun  enjoyed widespread support in the 1920s and 1930s but lost out to  after the Chinese Civil War. Currently, written pronouns are divided between the masculine human  (he, him), feminine human  (she, her), and non-human  (it), and similarly in the plural. This distinction does not exist in the spoken language, where moreover tā is restricted to animate reference; inanimate entities are usually referred to with demonstrative pronouns for 'this' and 'that'.

Other, rarer new written pronouns in the second person are nǐ ( "you, a deity"), nǐ ( "you, a male"), and nǐ ( "you, a female"). In the third person, they are tā ( "it, an animal"), tā ( "it, a deity"), and tā ( "it, an inanimate object"). Among users of traditional Chinese characters, these distinctions are only made in Taiwanese Mandarin; in simplified Chinese, tā is the only third-person non-human form and nǐ is the only second person form. The third person distinction between "he" and "she" remain in use in all forms of written standard Mandarin.

In the early 21st century, some members of genderfluid and queer Chinese online communities started using X也 and TA to refer to a generic, anonymous, or non-binary third person. As of June 2022, neither have been encoded as a single code point in Unicode, and neither are considered standard usage.

Additional notes
 The first-person pronouns  ǎn and  ǒu "I" are infrequently used in Mandarin conversation. They are of dialectal origin. However, their usage is gaining popularity among the young, most notably in online communications.
 According to Wang Li, the second person formal pronoun nín ( "you, formal; polite") is derived from the fusion of the second person plural nǐmen ( "you, formal; polite"), making it somewhat analogous to the distinction between T/V pronouns in Romance languages or thou/you in Early Modern English.  Consistent with this hypothesized origin, *nínmen is traditionally considered to be a grammatically incorrect expression for the formal second person plural.  Instead, the alternative phrases dàjiā (大家, "you, formal plural") and gèwèi  (各位, "you, formal plural") are used, with the latter being somewhat more formal than the former.  In addition, some dialects use an analogous formal third person pronoun tān (怹, "he/she, formal; polite").
 Traditional Chinese characters, as influenced by translations from Western languages and the Bible in the nineteenth century, occasionally distinguished gender in pronouns, although that distinction is abandoned in simplified Characters. Those traditional characters developed after Western contact include both masculine and feminine forms of "you" ( and ), rarely used today even in writings in traditional characters; in the simplified system,  is rare.

In other Sinitic languages 
There are many other pronouns in modern Sinitic languages, such as Taiwanese Minnan  "you" and Written Cantonese  (keúih deih) "they." They are not routinely encountered in colloquial speech.

Possessives 
To indicate alienable possession,  (de) is appended to the pronoun. For inalienable possession, such as family and entities very close to the owner, this may be omitted, e.g. (wǒ mā) "my mother". In literary style,  (qí) is sometimes used for "his" or "her" or as a gender-neutral pronoun; e.g.  means "his father" or "her father".

In Cantonese, for possessive,  (ge3) is appended to the pronoun.

Demonstrative pronouns

The demonstrative pronouns work the same as in English.

Traditional forms of these pronouns are:  (zhège),  (zhèxiē),  (nàge),  (nàxiē), and  tāmen.

Interrogative pronouns

Indefinite pronouns

Pronouns in imperial times

See also Chinese honorifics.

In imperial times, the pronoun for "I" was commonly omitted when speaking politely or to someone with higher social status. "I" was usually replaced with special pronouns to address specific situations. Examples include guǎrén during early Chinese history and zhèn after the Qin dynasty when the Emperor is speaking to his subjects. When the subjects speak to the Emperor, they address themselves as chén, or "your official". It was extremely impolite and taboo to address the Emperor as "you" or to refer to oneself as "I".

In modern times, the practice of self-deprecatory terms is still used in specific formal situations. In résumés, the term guì (lit. noble) is used for "you" and "your"; e.g., gùi gōngsī refers to "your company". Běnrén (lit. this person) is used to refer to oneself.

See also 

Chinese honorifics
Chinese grammar
 Chinese language
 Cantonese pronouns

References

Bibliography 

 
 
 

Pronouns by language
Pronouns